Amirabad (also Romanized as Amīrābād) is a village in Mazraeh Now Rural District, in the Central District of Ashtian County, Markazi Province, Iran. At the 2006 census, its population was 24, in 8 families.

References 

Populated places in Ashtian County